Justice Becker may refer to:

Francis H. Becker, associate justice of the Iowa Supreme Court
Nancy A. Becker, associate justice of the Supreme Court of Nevada